The Blacas papyri are two fragments of an Aramaic papyrus found in Saqqara in 1825. It is known as CIS II 145 and TAD C1.2.

The fragments are held in the British Library as Oriental Papyrus 106* A and B.

They were sold to the British Museum in 1866 by the estate of Pierre Louis Jean Casimir de Blacas, who had purchased it shortly after its discovery.

The text became the standard by which other Aramaic papyri were judged – particularly the Elephantine papyri:

From the Euting papyrus which entered the Strassburg Library in 1900 down to the very last published by Prof. Sachau in 1907 all have been judged upon the standard of the Blacassiani; and if not the slightest objection was made as to their referring to, or being dated after various kings of the Achemenides dynasty, it was so because in the year 1878 the "Revue Archéologique" set forth the theory that the Blacassiani were of that period, a theory which although passed over on its appearance by the very man to whom the public epistle propounding it was inscribed, Ernest Renan, gradually gained ground until the Marquis de Vogüé by its adoption caused it to be raised to the dignity of indisputable doctrine. But it is only natural and reasonable that, if the proof were furnished that the Blacassiani papyri have been misunderstood, any doctrine based on their faulty interpretation should fall to the ground, and that only one way should remain to deal with it: complete abandonment and total oblivion.

In recent years it was shown that the two fragments fit together, connecting by a single line.

Bibliography
 British Museum Papyrus CVI*, Facsimiles of manuscripts and inscriptions. Oriental series, 1875
 
 Gesenius, Papyri Blacassian, Scripturae linguaeque phoeniciae monumenta quotquot

Gallery

References

Aramaic papyri
Aramaic Egyptian papyri